Seana or Seána is a female given name. Notable people with the name include:

 Seána Kerslake (born 1990), Irish actress
 Seana Kofoed (born 1970), American television actress
 Seana McKenna (born 1956), Canadian actress
 Seana Shiffrin, American professor
 Seána Talbot, British healthcare manager and charity leader

Feminine given names